Asclepias albicans is a species of milkweed known by the common names whitestem milkweed and wax milkweed. It is native to the Mojave and Sonoran Deserts of California, Arizona, and Baja California. The sticklike branches are mostly naked, the younger ones coated in a waxy residue and a thin layer of woolly hairs. The leaves are ephemeral, growing in whorls of three on the lower branches and falling off after a short time. The plant usually blooms from March to May. The fruit is a large, long, thick follicle which dangles in bunches from the branch nodes.

Asclepias albicans is a larval host for the monarch butterfly.

The similar A. subulata is found in similar regions.

References

External links
Jepson Manual Treatment
Photo gallery

albicans
Flora of the California desert regions
Flora of Arizona
Flora of Baja California
Flora of the Sonoran Deserts
Natural history of the Colorado Desert
Natural history of the Mojave Desert
North American desert flora
Butterfly food plants
Flora without expected TNC conservation status